The Part-time Workers (Prevention of Less Favourable Treatment) Regulations 2000 (SI 2000/1551)is a UK labour law measure which requires that employers give people on part-time contracts comparable treatment to people on full-time contracts who do the same jobs. It implements the Part-time Work Directive 97/81/EC, and forms part of the European Union's programme to combat discrimination of atypical workers. Because the large majority of part-time workers are female, it is also an important attempt to combat sex discrimination.

Texts of EU and UK legislation
 Council Directive 97/81/EC of 15 December 1997 concerning the Framework Agreement on part-time work concluded by UNICE, CEEP and the ETUC - Annex: Framework agreement on part-time work
Implemented under Part-time Workers (Prevention of Less Favourable Treatment) Regulations 2000, SI 2000/1551
 Council Directive 1999/70/EC of 28 June 1999 concerning the framework agreement on fixed-term work concluded by ETUC, UNICE and CEEP
Implemented under Fixed Term Employees (Prevention of Less Favourable Treatment) Regulations 2002, SI 2002/2034
 Directive 2008/104/EC of the European Parliament and of the Council of 19 November 2008 on temporary agency work
 Implementation: by 5 December 2011.

See also

Employment discrimination law in the United Kingdom
Agency Workers Directive
UK agency worker law
McMenemy v Capita Business Ltd [2007]CSIH 25

Notes

References
A McColgan, ‘Missing The Point?’ (2000) 29 ILJ 260
A McColgan, 'The Fixed Term Employees (Prevention of Less Favourable Treatment) Regulations 2002: Fiddling While Rome Burns?' [2003] 32 ILJ 194

United Kingdom labour law
Statutory Instruments of the United Kingdom
2000 in British law
2000 in labor relations